Saponaria pumila is a species of perennial plants in the family Caryophyllaceae, commonly known as dwarf soapwort. It is native to the eastern Alps of Austria and Italy and the southern parts of the Eastern Carpathians in Romania.

References

Caryophyllaceae
Plants described in 1907
Saponaceous plants